GX-19 is a COVID-19 vaccine candidate developed by Genexine consortium.

It is a DNA-based vaccine that encodes the SARS-CoV-2 spike protein.

References 

Clinical trials
South Korean COVID-19 vaccines
DNA vaccines
Science and technology in South Korea